Podgorje is a village in central Croatia, in the municipality of Gvozd, Sisak-Moslavina County. It is connected by the D6 highway.

History

Demographics
According to the 2011 census, the village of Podgorje has 150 inhabitants. This represents 53.00% of its pre-war population according to the 1991 census.

Population by ethnicity

Notable people

References 

Populated places in Sisak-Moslavina County
Serb communities in Croatia